The Roman Catholic Diocese of Kodungalloor- Kottapuram is a diocese located in the town of Kodungallur in the Ecclesiastical province of Verapoly in India. On Saturday, December 18, 2010, Pope Benedict XVI named Joseph Karikkassery, Auxiliary Bishop of the Roman Catholic Archdiocese of Verapoly, as Bishop of Kottapuram. The diocese had until then been a vacant see (sede vacante), as Bishop Francis Kallarakal had been appointed by Pope Benedict XVI in February 2010 as Metropolitan Archbishop of the Roman Catholic Archdiocese of Verapoly, India (the Diocese of Kottapuram is in its Ecclesiastical Province). The previous Archbishop of Verapoly had died.

History
 July 3, 1987: Established as Diocese of Kottapuram from the Metropolitan Archdiocese of Verapoly

Leadership
 Bishops of Kottapuram (Roman Rite)
 Bishop Dr. Francis Kallarakal (October 4, 1987 – February 20, 2010); appointed as Metropolitan Archbishop of the Roman Catholic Archdiocese of Verapoly
 Bishop Joseph Karikkassery (December 18, 2010 – present); formerly had been Auxiliary Bishop of Verapoly to Archbishop Kallarakal
The recent Bishop is Joseph Karikkassery, the son of Francis and Agnes. Late Rocky is his elder brother and Philomina, w/o Jerome is his sister.

Lay Organisation Leaders

KLCA
Kerala Latin Catholic Association of Kottapuram
 First President - P.R. Lawrance, Gothuruth
 General Secretary - Babu Manjaly, Eriyad

KCYM 
Kerala Catholic Youth Movement  
First Committee **
 Joy Gothuruth - President
 David Xavier, Koratty - Vice President
 Benny Pullayil, Koottukad - Gen.Secretary
 Jerson Chakkanat, Kottapuram - Secretary
 Sebastian Konnully. Paravur - Treasurer
 Micheal P. T., Kunjithai - Sports Forum
 George Arakkathara, Madaplathuruth - Exe.member
 Francis.E.D., Eriyad- Socio- Political Forum
 Stanly Koodallur, Kottapuram - Exe. Comm.
 Jessy.E.C, Gothuruth - Exe.
 Joy Kaimathuruthy, Gothuruth - Education Forum
 Shyja E. R., Kara - Arts Forum
 Beena K. A., Kunjithai - Exe.

References

External links
 GCatholic.org
 Catholic Hierarchy 
  Diocese website 

Roman Catholic dioceses in India
Christian organizations established in 1987
Roman Catholic dioceses and prelatures established in the 20th century
Dioceses in Kerala
1987 establishments in Kerala
Churches in Thrissur district